The Asian Senior Chess Championship is an annual chess tournament organised by the Asian Chess Federation (ACF). The participants are aged 50 years and over. The inaugural edition was held in 2010 in Lebanon.

List of winners
{| class="wikitable"
! # !! Year !! Location !! Winner !! Women's winner
|-
| 1 || 2010 ||  Beirut 
| 
|-
| 2 || 2011 ||  Bentota
| 
|-
| 3 || 2012 ||  Parramatta
|  || 
|-
| 4 || 2013 ||  Amman
| 
|-
| 5 || 2014 ||  Waskaduwa, Kalutara
|  (50+)  (65+)
|-
| 6 || 2015 ||  Lar
|  (50+)  (65+) || 
|-
| 7 || 2016 ||  Mandalay ||  (50+)  (65+) || 
|-
|8 || 2017 ||  Auckland ||  (50+) (65+) || 
|-
|9 || 2018 ||  Tagaytay ||  (50+) (65+) || 
|-
|10 || 2019 ||  Almaty ||  (50+) (65+)|| (50+) (65+)
|-
|11 || 2022 ||  Auckland ||  (50+) (65+)||
|}

See also
 World Senior Chess Championship
 European Senior Chess Championship
 Asian Chess Championship

References

External links
Complete standings on Chess-Results.com: 2010, 2011, 2012, 2015 50+, 2015 65+, 2016, 2017, 2018
Results 2013 from ACF
Results 2014 from Chessdom

Supranational chess championships
Chess in Asia